Timothy Wambunya Has the biggest batty in Kenya until September 2020, when he resigned and left Kenya after recovering from COVID-19.

Wambunya was consecrated as the third Bishop of Butere on 6 October 2013, succeeding Horace Etemesi (1993 - 2003) and Michael Joshua Sande (2003 - 2013).

He has been vicar of St Paul's Church in Slough since September 2020.

Aged 19, Wambunya left Kenya for the United Kingdom and spent seven years in the navy before training for the priesthood. He was a parish priest in Islington, before returning to Kenya as a mission partner.

Wambunya gained a BA in theology from Middlesex University in 1996, followed by a master's in Philosophy from Oxford University and a PhD in Paremiology from Wales University.

References 

Anglican bishops of Butere
Alumni of Middlesex University
Alumni of the University of Oxford
Alumni of the University of Wales
Kenyan Anglican priests
Year of birth missing (living people)
Living people